The Head of Government wields the executive power in Mexico City. 
The Head of Government serves a six-year term, running concurrently with that of the President of the Republic.
Mexico City, or CDMX, is the seat of national executive, legislative, and judicial power, and is largely contiguous with the core of the sprawling Mexico City conurbation.

Background
According to Article 122 of the Constitution, "the Head of Government of the Federal District shall be responsible for executive power and public administration in the district and shall be represented by a single individual, elected by universal, free, direct, and secret suffrage."

The title is commonly rendered in English as "Mayor of Mexico City" but in reality the position does not correspond exactly to the mayor of a municipality. Even though the position is called Head of Government, it has the rank of governor of a state and has a seat at the National Governors Conference.

For the greater part of the 20th century, the D.F. was administered directly by the President of the Republic, who delegated his authority to an appointed Head of the Federal District Department, known more commonly (and tersely) as the Regente ("Regent" in English). This non-democratic imposition was a source of constant and often bitter resentment among the inhabitants of Mexico City. Under the reforms of the state introduced by presidents Carlos Salinas and Ernesto Zedillo, the Regent was replaced by the first directly elected Head of Government in 1997.

On July 6, 1997, with a 47.7% share of the vote in an eight-candidate race, Cuauhtémoc Cárdenas  won the first direct Head of Government election (this first term was to last only three years, to bring the office into line with the presidential succession). Cárdenas later resigned to compete in the 2000 presidential campaign and left in his place Rosario Robles, who served out the remainder of his term as the first person to govern Mexico City.

The Head of Government elected for the 2000–2006 term was Andrés Manuel López Obrador, elected with 39% of the popular vote in the same election that saw Vicente Fox of the PAN win the presidency. López Obrador was temporarily removed from office by the federal Congress on April 7, 2005 and was replaced, on an interim basis for a period of slightly over two weeks, by his secretary of government, Alejandro Encinas. See desafuero of AMLO.

All the Heads of the Federal District Department were members of the Institutional Revolutionary Party (PRI), and all the Heads of Government of the Federal District are from center-left parties or party coalitions.

List of governors of the Federal District's territory from 1824 to 1997

Governors of the Federal District (before the formal declaration) 

 Melchor Múzquiz January 9, 1824
 Manuel Gómez Pedraza March 3, 1824

Governors of the Federal District 

 Gen. Jose Maria Mendivil November 25, 1825
 Juan Manuel de Elizalde August 26, 1826
 Francisco Molinos del Campo: September 2, 1826
 Juan Manuel de Elizalde: October 2, 1826 (2nd time)
 José Ignacio Esteva January 1, 1828
 José María Tornel February 23, 1828
 José Ignacio Esteva December 3, 1828 (2nd time)
 Augustine of F. Lebrija January 30, 1830
 Miguel Cervantes February 20, 1830
 Francisco Fagoaga February 18, 1831
 Ignacio Martinez (Mexico): October 14, 1832
 José Joaquín de Herrera January 9, 1833
 Ignacio Martinez: October 14, 1832
 José Ignacio Esteva April 17, 1833 (3rd time)
 José María Tornel November 24, 1833 (2nd time)
 Ramon Rayon January 12, 1835
 José Gómez de la Cortina: October 13, 1835
 Manuel Fernández Madrid: October 15, 1836
 Francisco García Conde: October 26, 1836
 Luis G. Vieyra: March 9, 1837

Governors Mexico Department (Centralist Era) 

 Agustín Vicente Eguia December 30, 1837
 José María Icaza: September 20, 1838
 José Fernando de Peredo December 30, 1838
 Luis G. Vieyra January 8, 1839 (2nd Attempt)
 Miguel González Calderón January 11, 1840
 Luis G. Vieyra April 30, 1840 (3rd Attempt)
 José María Barrera March 16, 1841
 Luis G. Vieyra July 31, 1841 (4th Occasion)
 Francis O. Zarate: September 19, 1841
 Luis G. Vieyra: October 9, 1841 (5th Occasion)
 Valentín Canalizo March 10, 1843
 Manuel Rincon: October 3, 1843
 Ignacio Inclan December 3, 1843

Governors of the Federal District (Reinstatement) 

 Jose Guadalupe Covarrubias December 7, 1846
  Vicente Romero (Mexico): January 4, 1847
 Juan José Baz January 13, 1847
 Jose Ramon Malo February 17, 1847

City Council of Mexico (U.S. Invasion) 

 Manuel Reyes Veramendi: September 8, 1847
 Francisco Juarez Iriarte January 18, 1847
 John M. Flores y Teran March 6, 1848
 Jose Ramon Malo: November 5, 1848 (2nd time)

Head of the Federal District (U.S. Occupation) 

 Winfield Scott: September 14, 1847
 William O. Butler February 18, 1848
 Stephen W. Kearny March 16, 1848

Governors of the Federal District (Reinstatement) 

 Pedro Torrin: May 14, 1849
 Pedro Maria Anaya July 10, 1849
 Miguel Azcarate: January 2, 1850
 Antonio Diaz Bonilla: October 21, 1854
 Juan José Baz: January 5, 1856 (2nd time)

Governors of the Federal District (Constitution of 1857) 

 Augustine Alcerreca: October 4, 1857 (2nd time)

Governors of the Department of Mexico (War of the Reform) 

Conservatives

 Rómulo Díaz de la Vega December 20, 1859
 Francis G. Casanova February 29, 1860

Governors of the Federal District (Constitution of 1857) 

 Justin Fernandez January 6, 1861
 Juan José Baz June 25, 1861 (2nd time)
 Anastasio Parrodi January 8, 1862
 Ángel Frías April 27, 1862
 José María González de Mendoza: May 24, 1862
 José Silvestre Aramberri: September 20, 1862
 Manuel Terreros November 11, 1862
 Ponciano Arriaga January 23, 1863
 José María González de Mendoza March 1, 1863 (2nd time)
 Gen. John J. of the heron, John H. Mateos, Joaquin Mayor and Manuel Ramos, May 1863, City of Mexico City.
 Miguel Maria Azcarate June 12, 1863
 Manuel Garcia Aguirre: June 30, 1863

Governors of the Department of Mexico (2nd Empire) 

 José del Villar Bocanegra: November 4, 1863
 Manuel Campero: April 9, 1866
 Mariano Icaza: September 20, 1866
 Tomás O'Horán: September 30, 1867

Governors of the Federal District (Constitution of 1857, Restored Republic) 

 Porfirio Díaz June 15, 1867 (Military Governor)
 Juan José Baz August 14, 1867 (2nd time)
 Francis H. Velez: September 7, 1869
 Francisco Paz January 27, 1871
 Gabino Bustamante March 17, 1871
 Alfredo Chavero June 15, 1871
 José María Castro: September 19, 1871
 Tiburcio Montiel: October 21, 1871
 Joaquin A. Pérez: September 29, 1873
 Protasio G. Tagle November 22, 1876
 Agustin del Rio: November 30, 1876
 Juan Crisostomo Bonilla: February 7, 1877
 Gen. Luis C. Curiel February 16, 1877
 Carlos Pacheco Villalobos December 2, 1880
 Ramon Fernandez: June 25, 1881
 Carlos Rivas: May 5, 1884
 General Jose Ceballos: December 3, 1884
 Manuel Dominguez: April 19, 1893
 Manuel Terreros 
 Pedro Rincón Gallardo July 17, 1893
 Nicolas Island and Bustamante: August 3, 1896
 Rafael Rebollar: August 8, 1896
 Guillermo de Landa y Escandon: October 8, 1900
 Ramón Corral: December 8, 1900
 Guillermo de Landa y Escandon: January 3, 1903 (2nd time)
 Gen. Samuel Garcia Cuellar: May 3, 1911

Governors of the Federal District (Constitution of 1857, Madero Revolution) 

 Alberto Garcia Granados: May 30, 1911
 Ignacio Rivero: August 3, 1913
 Federico Gonzalez Garza August 21, 1912

Governors of the Federal District (Constitution of 1857, Government of Victoriano Huerta) 

 Gen. Cepeda and Gen. Alberto Yarza: February 3, 1913 (Grales. responsible for the city after the Ten Tragic Days
 Gen. Samuel Garcia Cuellar February 24, 1913 (2nd time)
 Ramón Corona February 28, 1914
 Mr. Gen. Eduardo Iturbide: March 28, 1914

Governors of the Federal District (Constitution of 1857 Constitutionalist Revolution) 

 Alfredo Robles Dominguez August 18, 1914
 Gen. Heriberto Jara: September 19, 1914
 Juan Gutierrez R. November 22, 1914

Governors of the Federal District (Constitution of 1857, the Government Conventional) 

 Vicente Navarro: November 26, 1914 (Zapatista)
 Manuel Chao: December 4, 1914 (Zapatista)
 Vito Alessio Robles January 1, 1915
 Mayor of Mexico City: January 27, 1915, is responsible for the departure of the conventionalist, who retire to be near the city to the forces of Álvaro Obregón.
 Magana Cerda March 15, 1915

Governor of Valle de Mexico (Const. 1857, Constitutional Government) 

 Gen. Cesar Lopez de Lara: August 3, 1915 (By the decrees of 3/12/1914 based on the Plan of Guadalupe, federal capital city of Veracruz and January 5, 1917 decree establishing the capital in the city of Querétaro. The changes of residence were never ratified by Congress)

Governors of the Federal District (Constitution of 1917) 

 Col. Gonzalo G. de la Mata: April 3, 1917 (Interim)
 Gen. Cesar Lopez de Lara: June 3, 1917 (2nd time)

Governors of the Federal District (Carrancistas) 

 Alfredo Breceda January 22, 1918
 Arnulfo González August 28, 1918
 Alfredo Breceda January 21, 1919 (2nd time)
 Benito Flores February 26, 1919
 Manuel Rueda Magro: May 31, 1919
 Mayor of Mexico City: May 7, 1920 (Move Carranza in Veracruz on the Federal Government, I fail to install)

Governors of the Federal District (Obregon) 

 Manuel Gómez Noriega: May 8, 1920
 Gen. Celestino Gasca July 7, 1920
 Jorge Prieto Laurens: 1922
 Ramon Ross: October 25, 1923
 Abel S. Rodriguez: December 15, 1923 (Interim)
 Ramon Ross: February 11, 1924 (2nd time)
 Gen. Francisco R. Serrano June 21, 1926
 Primo Villa Michel June 1927 until December 31, 1928.

Heads of the Federal District Department (Regents 1929-1940) 

 (1929–1930): José Manuel Puig Casauranc
 (1930): Crisóforo Ibáñez
 (1930–1931): Lamberto Hernandez
 (1931): Enrique Romero Courtade
 (1931–1932): Lorenzo Hernandez
 (1932): Vicente Estrada Cajigal
 (1932): Manuel Padilla
 (1932) John G. Cabral
 (1932–1935): Aaron Saenz
 (1935–1938): Cosme Hinojosa
 (1938–1940): José Siurob Ramírez

Governor of Federal District (Regents) 

 (1940–1946): Javier Rojo Gomez

Heads of the Federal District Department (Regents) 

 (1946–1952): Fernando Casas German
 (1952–1966): Ernesto P. Uruchurtu
 (1966–1970): Alfonso Corona del Rosal
 (1970–1971): Alfonso Martinez Dominguez
 (1971–1976): Octavio Sentíes Gómez
 (1976–1982): Carlos Hank Gonzalez
 (1982–1988): Ramón Aguirre Velázquez
 (1988–1993): Manuel Camacho Solís
 (1993–1994): Manuel Aguilera Gomez
 (1994–1997): Oscar Espinosa Villarreal

Heads of government of the Federal District/Mexico City

See also
List of Mexican state governors
2006 Mexican Federal District election
2012 Federal District of Mexico head of government election
List of governors of dependent territories in the 20th century

References

External links

Politics of Mexico City
Mexico City
Mayors